Journal intime is the debut studio album from French singer Aya Nakamura. It was released on 25 August 2017 by Warner Music France. 

The album features guest appearances by MHD, Dadju, Jizo Djohn P., Lartiste and Gradur. It was preceded by six singles: "Brisé", "Oublier", "Super héros", "Comportement", "Oumou Sangaré" and "Angela", all of which charted in Nakamura's home country France.

Background and promotion 
She did a concert at the Modibo-Keïta stadium in Bamako, opening for the American-Nigerian star Davido. And she dedicated a song to one of the most famous Malian singer Oumou Sangaré, who was born in Bamako just like her. In January 2016, the singer signed a deal with Rec. 118, a label from Warner music France. During the same year, she kept on doing collaborations and she released her second single "Super Héros", featuring the rapper Gradur. On 23 September 2017, she participated to La Nuit du Mali in Bercy organized by the Wati-Boss, Dawala in order to celebrate the Independence Day of Mali in Paris. She shared the stage with Oumou Sangaré and other Malian artists such as Cheick Tidiane Seck, Lassana Hawa or Mokobé among others.

Track listing

Charts

Weekly charts

Year-end charts

References

2017 debut albums
Aya Nakamura albums